Sweney is the surname of:

Cyril Edward Sweney (1889/90–?), Deputy Inspector General of Police in Madras, India
John R. Sweney (1837–1899), American gospel composer
Joseph Henry Sweney (1845–1918), U.S. Congressman from Iowa
Susan Sweney (1915–1983), British radio broadcaster for the Nazis in World War II, daughter of Cyril Sweney